Rosalia (minor planet designation: 314 Rosalia) is a large Main belt asteroid. It was discovered by Auguste Charlois on 1 September 1891 in Nice.

Photometric observations of this asteroid collected during 2006 show a rotation period of 20.43 ± 0.02 hours with a brightness variation of 0.21 ± 0.02 magnitude.

References

External links 
 Lightcurve plot of 314 Rosalia, Palmer Divide Observatory, B. D. Warner (2006)
 Asteroid Lightcurve Database (LCDB), query form (info )
 Dictionary of Minor Planet Names, Google books
 Asteroids and comets rotation curves, CdR – Observatoire de Genève, Raoul Behrend
 Discovery Circumstances: Numbered Minor Planets (1)-(5000) – Minor Planet Center
 
 

000314
Discoveries by Auguste Charlois
Named minor planets
18910901